Camp: Notes on Fashion was the 2019 high fashion art exhibition of the Anna Wintour Costume Center, a wing of the Metropolitan Museum of Art in New York that houses the collection of the Costume Institute.

The exhibition focused on the fashion style of camp, an aesthetic style and sensibility that regards something as appealing because of its bad taste and ironic value. It ran from May 8 through September 9, 2019, and was preceded by the annual Costume Institute Gala, an annual fundraising gala benefiting the Costume Institute, and considered to be the fashion industry's biggest and most prestigious yearly event, on May 6. Each year's gala celebrates the theme of that year's exhibition, and the exhibition sets the tone for the formal dress of the night.

Costume Institute's annual exhibitions 
The Costume Institute at the Metropolitan Museum of Art inaugurates its annual exhibition with a formal benefit dinner at the Costume Institute Gala, also known as the Met Gala. The gala for the 2019 exhibition took place on May 6, 2019. The co-chairs for the Gala were Lady Gaga, Alessandro Michele, Harry Styles, Serena Williams, and Anna Wintour. Co-chairs are chosen by the permanent Met Gala co-chairs, like Anna Wintour, for each Met Gala. They're chosen greatly in part because of their contribution to and relation to the theme. Co-chairs are not necessarily always solely fashion-focused individuals. As seen above, a diverse group of athletes, musicians, and more are brought together in order to cultivate more dynamic ideas. Mostly, they're brought on in order to  Past galas have seen celebrities wear outlandish and controversial outfits. Of the co-chairs, Lady Gaga is well known for embodying the camp style, including her wearing of a dress made of raw meat at the 2010 MTV Video Music Awards.
The commercial success of the Costume Institute in 2018 proved to be a watershed moment for the Met and, more broadly, the art world. Fashion, which was once thought to be a less serious art form, was shown to be financially stable. The Costume Institute's successful exhibition series began in 2011, with the art show Alexander McQueen: Savage Beauty, which drew over 650,000 visitors. This was surpassed in terms of foot traffic by China: Through the Looking Glass in 2015 and Manus x Machina: Fashion in an Age of Technology in 2016. Heavenly Bodies: Fashion and the Catholic Imagination, a 2018 exhibition at the Costume Institute, broke the Met's all-time attendance record with 1.6 million visitors.The Anna Wintour Costume Center organized the exhibition, which was curated by Andrew Bolton and Harold Anya. McQueen's pieces were on display from the archives from his own London fashion house, Alexander McQueen, and the Parisian couture house Givenchy, as well as pieces from private collections. In 1999, the V&A launched Fashion in Motion, a series of live catwalk events at the museum featuring pieces from historically important fashion collections. In June 1999, Alexander McQueen was the star of the first show. Every year since then, the museum has recreated various designer shows, including Elspeth Gibson, Anna Sui, Tristan Webber, Chunghie Lee, Jean Paul Gaultier, Kenzo, Gianfranco Ferré, Christian Lacroix, etc.The exhibition was a huge success for the museum, with memberships increasing by 15% and over 650,000 people viewing it, making it one of the most popular in the Met's history.

Background 

In Anna Wintour's Go Ask Anna, her weekly video series answering questions from fashion fans, she explained that Andrew Bolton, chief curator of the Costume Institute, chooses the theme, sometimes up to five years in advance. She also shared that her only advice was that the title of the show needed to be clear so "everybody understands it immediately".

The theme from the exhibit was announced as the Gala theme October 9, 2018. Andrew Bolton, the Wendy Yu Curator in Charge of the Costume Institute, framed the exhibition around Susan Sontag's 1964 essay "[[Notes on "Camp"|Notes on 'Camp''']]", which considers meanings and connotations of the word "camp". Her "influential" essay includes "58 points detailing the ways the concept of "camp" can be constructed." It arguably brought camp into the mainstream, and made Sontag a literary celebrity. Sontag wrote, "Indeed the essence of Camp is its love of the unnatural: of artifice and exaggeration."

Bolton found Sontag's observations of camp, the "love of the unnatural: of artifice and exaggeration ... style at the expense of content ... the triumph of the epicene style", "timely with what we are going through culturally and politically". Bolton notes that 'camp' embraces elements including "irony, humor, parody, pastiche, artifice, theatricality, excess, extravagance, nostalgia, and exaggeration". He added that the theme is timely, and "very relevant to the cultural conversation to look at what is often dismissed as empty frivolity but can be actually a very sophisticated and powerful political tool, especially for marginalized cultures." Bolton noted camp never lost its subversive element from the 1960s when the essay was written and used as a "private code primarily in the gay community".

Bolton traced camp back to the French verb se camper, to strike an exaggerated pose, its origins in the flamboyant posturing of the French court under Louis XIV. Louis XIV himself consolidated power by compelling noblemen to spend their wealth at Versailles on fashions and jewelry to adorn themselves while taking part in elaborate, mandatory social dances and faux battles. His gay younger brother, Philippe I, duc d'Orléans, was "in many ways the paradigm of camp", with his obsession with clothing and jewelry, and "besotted with his pretty male favorites". "Camp became the "ultimate expression" of Philippe I, Duke of Orléans, who "devoted his life to dancing and dressing up and although he was married twice he was flamboyantly gay.""

Author Andy Medhurst notes the definition has changed throughout history, "It was first a French verb ("to flaunt" or "posture"), then an adjective with a gay connotation in the 18th century, and most recently, a noun to describe exaggerated gestures and actions." Kareem Khubchandani, queer studies and performance studies professor at Tufts University, has said "Camp makes profane the things that are sacred and is a queer way of knowing."

The exhibition centered around camp. Camp has been defined in many different ways. Phillip Core, American artist, referred to camp by saying "The essence of dandyism consists of being obsessed with and knowledgeable about the limits of 'how far one can go too far.'" Kenneth Williams, English actor, said that "Camp is a great jewel, 22 carats."

 Exhibition 

The exhibition is presented in the Met Fifth Avenue's Iris and B. Gerald Cantor Exhibition Hall, and was underwritten by Gucci, whose creative director Alessandro Michele, said Sontag's essay "perfectly expresses what camp truly means to me: the unique ability of combining high art and pop culture". The Metropolitan Museum's director, Max Hollein stated: "Camp's disruptive nature and subversion of modern aesthetic values has often been trivialized, but this exhibition will reveal its profound influence on both high art and popular culture." Sontag's essay is on display next to a photo of her and is part of the exhibition.

The exhibit, designed by the scenographer Jan Versweyveld, has 175 pieces of fashion including menswear, womenswear, and 75 sculptures, paintings and drawings relating to the theme. The pieces date back as early as the 1600s. The show is presented in two parts, starting with the origins of camp as a concept, with Sontag as a ghost narrator, Bolton finds camp in the Stonewall riots, and used in LGBTQ communities. The two sections are physically designed apart with the first section featuring "narrow corridors with low ceilings," projecting a "clandestine underground" mood with Sontag "narrating in whispers."

The exhibit then uses 100 examples from the 1960s onward to show how camp has become more mainstream by examples in the collections by Balenciaga, Prada and Vetements, as well as Gucci. Bolton aims to portray how ubiquitous the concept of camp is with this exhibit manifest. The second half's structural design "is an open piazza," mirroring "mainstream acceptance". In all, around 37 fashion designers are represented, with 175 fashion pieces. Also on display is a full-length portrait of Oscar Wilde, spokesman for aestheticism, in a frock coat.

As a soundtrack for the show, the camp anthem Judy Garland's "Over the Rainbow", her signature song from 1939's The Wizard of Oz, plays intermittently in both sections of the show. The Wizard of Oz version in the first section, and a recording shortly before her death plays in the second section. Garland is considered a gay icon, particularly because of this song.

 Catalog 

The exhibition catalog was published in two volumes and also adheres to the camp theme with its pale pink casing, and an engraved quote from Oscar Wilde, on the book's spine in gold: "One should either be a work of art or wear a work of art." The co-writers are Andrew Bolton, Karen Van Godtsenhoven, and Amanda Garfinkel. The catalog is in two chartreuse volumes of the history and modern applications of camp, including the full text of Susan Sontag's Notes on "Camp"''.

The first volume has scholar Fabio Cleto's comprehensive essay on camp followed by a visual history guide of camp sensibility. The second volume has an essay by Andrew Bolton, the Wendy Yu curator in charge of the Costume Institute, outlying inspirations and interpretations of camp for the exhibition. The second volume includes 160 images from photographer Johnny Dufort, each image is paired with a quote on camp.

Gallery

See also 

 Camp (1965 film)
 Polari
Haute couture

References

Further reading
 

Metropolitan Museum of Art exhibitions
2019 in art
Fashion exhibitions